Joshua John Francis Earl (born 24 October 1998) is an English professional footballer who plays as a defender for Fleetwood Town.

Career

Preston North End 
Earl joined Preston North End at the age of nine and signed a scholarship in July 2015. He featured for the youth team as a defender midfielder and striker. He was also part of the side that reached the FA Youth Cup quarter-finals and scored two goals during the campaign. Earl signed his first professional deal in April 2017.

On 19 August 2017, Earl made his debut in a 1–0 win over Reading. He was called into the side after Greg Cunningham was ruled out due to injury.

Lancaster City (loan) 
On 24 March 2017, Earl joined Northern Premier League Division One North champions Lancaster City on loan for the remainder of the season. Earl made his debut off the bench in a 3–0 win at Radcliffe Borough the following day.

Bolton Wanderers (loan) 
On 3 August 2019, Earl joined League One side Bolton Wanderers on loan until January 2020. He made his debut in a 2–0 defeat at Wycombe Wanderers the same day but had to be substituted after 15 minutes due to an injury which kept him out of action for three months. He returned to the bench on 19 October for Bolton's 1–3 defeat against Rochdale and started in the next game, Bolton's first win of the season, on 22 October, a 2–0 away win against Bristol Rovers.

Ipswich Town (loan) 
On 13 January 2020, Earl joined League One side Ipswich Town on loan until the end of the 2019–20 season. He made his debut on 8 February, featuring as a second-half substitute in a 1–0 loss to Sunderland. He made 7 appearances before returning to Preston on 4 May.

Burton Albion (loan) 

On 1 February 2021, Earl was loaned out again, this time joining League One side Burton Albion until the end of the season.

Fleetwood Town
On 27 June 2022, Earl joined League One club Fleetwood Town on a two-year contract after his contract was terminated by mutual consent.

Career statistics

Notes

Honours 
Lancaster City
 Northern Premier League Division One North: 2016–17

References

External links 

1998 births
Living people
English footballers
Association football defenders
Footballers from Southport
Preston North End F.C. players
Lancaster City F.C. players
Bolton Wanderers F.C. players
Ipswich Town F.C. players
Burton Albion F.C. players
Fleetwood Town F.C. players
English Football League players
Northern Premier League players